Estonia was represented by 21 athletes at the 2012 European Athletics Championships held in Helsinki, Finland.

Medals

Results

Men

Track

Combined

Field

Women

Track

Combined

Field

References

Participants and results

Nations at the 2012 European Athletics Championships
2012
European Athletics Championships